Patemm Inc. is a privately held company that specializes in baby changing pads. The company was founded in 2004 and is located in San Francisco, California. Grace Welch is the company’s founder and president. She named the company after her first two children, Patrick and Emma, after watching them repeatedly squirm off traditional pads.

Patemm pads are unique in their round design. The pads are intended to accommodate squirmy infants and serve as an all-in-one carrier for diapers, wipes, and a change of clothes.  All Patemm products are manufactured in San Francisco and patented under US Patent #: 7,520,010 and Design Patent #: D508181.

References

Infant products companies